Alpha Oumar Lelouma Barry is a Guinean professional footballer who plays for Thai club Maejo United in the Thai League 3 as a striker. He is yet to represent Guinea internationally
and intends to continue his career in Europe.

Career

Cambodia

Occupying Nagaworld's foreign slot for the 2014 and 2015 seasons, Lelouma was the first Guinean in the Cambodian League, and was called "Barry" by the fans. Over the course of his time there, he racked more than 10 goals each season including a hat-trick when Naga crushed Western 5–0 in 2014 and four goals in an 8–0 rout of the same team in 2015 before his contract expired at the end of 2015.

Thailand

Told by a so-called "player agent" that he had come to terms with a Malaysian side, the agent actually arranged fake deals for ingenuous African footballers and was never caught for his turpitude. Marooned in Malaysia, the frontman found someone who advised him to continue his career in Thailand where he successfully trialed for Bangkok Christian College through a friend, finishing 3rd despite finding hard to adjust with the high expectations for foreigners. For the U19 Championship, he was recruited by the Thai League 1's BEC Tero where he reached the U19 final, getting the better of opponents BBCU and finished top scorer. Penciling in a move to Look Isan in 2016 through Guinean Ousmane Cherif the Guinean scored when they overcame Pattaya 1-0 to qualify for the 2016 Thai League Cup but separated with them mid-season.

Myanmar

Decided on a one-year contract with Southern Myanmar for the 2018 Myanmar National League.

Personal life

The goalscorer's father died in 2016.

References

External links 
 SuperSub Thailand Profile
Thaileague Official Website: Maejo United F.C. Players

Living people
Guinean footballers
Myanmar National League players
Expatriate footballers in Thailand
Association football forwards
Guinean expatriate footballers
Expatriate footballers in Myanmar
Expatriate footballers in Cambodia
Hafia FC players
Barry Lelouma
Nagaworld FC players
1994 births
Southern Myanmar F.C. players